Shock and Awe is a 2017 American drama film starring and directed by Rob Reiner and written by Joey Hartstone. The film also stars Woody Harrelson, Tommy Lee Jones, James Marsden, Milla Jovovich, and Jessica Biel, and follows a group of journalists at Knight Ridder's Washington Bureau who investigate the rationale behind the Bush Administration's then-impending 2003 invasion of Iraq. The film had its world premiere at the Zurich Film Festival on September 30, 2017. It was released through DirecTV Cinema on June 14, 2018, before having a limited release in theaters on July 13, 2018, by Vertical Entertainment.

Premise

Journalists investigate the Bush Administration's claims that Iraq, led by Saddam Hussein,  possessed weapons of mass destruction. These claims were used a rationale and justification for the 2003 invasion of Iraq.

Knight Ridder Washington reporters Warren Strobel and Jonathan Landay received the Raymond Clapper Memorial award from the Senate Press Gallery on February 5, 2004, for their coverage of the questionable intelligence used to justify war with Iraq.

Cast

Production 
On July 12, 2016, Woody Harrelson was set as one of the leads of the film, reteaming with Reiner after LBJ. On July 13, 2016, James Marsden was added as well. The film features an interview with Dick Cheney on Meet the Press.

Filming
Principal photography on the film began in Louisiana on October 5, 2016. In October 2016, Alec Baldwin left the cast, reportedly due to financial timing. In November 2016, filming also took place in Washington, D.C.

Walcott has said he believed the film to be essentially "word-for-word" accurate. At one point in the film, Walcott gives an inspiring speech to the newsroom, but the original script had a screenwriter's version. On the day of shooting, Strobel said to Reiner that he should use Walcott's original words; Reiner had Walcott write down his exact speech, and Reiner then performed and filmed the scene.

Release
The film had its world premiere at the Zurich Film Festival on September 30, 2017. Shortly after, Vertical Entertainment and DirecTV Cinema acquired distribution rights to the film. The film was released through DirecTV on June 14, 2018, before beginning a limited release in 100 theaters on July 13, 2018.

Reception

Box office
Shock and Awe grossed $77,980 in the United States and Canada and $104,435 in other territories, for a worldwide total of $182,415, plus $2.6 million with home video sales.

Critical response
On review aggregator Rotten Tomatoes, the film holds an approval rating of 30% based on 47 reviews, with an average rating of 4.70/10. The website's critical consensus reads, "Shock and Awe has a worthy story to tell and some fine actors trying to bring it to life; unfortunately, the end results are still as derivative as they are dramatically inert." On Metacritic, the film has a weighted average score of 47 out of 100, based on 18 critics, indicating "mixed or average reviews".

Writing for Rolling Stone, David Fear gave the film 2/5 stars, saying, "It's an important story to remember right now, assuming you can remember anything after being beaten over the head with talking points for 90 minutes. But at its best, Shock and Awe still feels like it strains to be Spotlight-lite and comes up lacking. The title is a misnomer." Kerry Lengel of The Arizona Republic gave the film 1.5 out of 5 stars, writing, "It's trite and mechanistic in its attempts to build pathos while also making its arguments, from the opening scene featuring a soldier paralyzed by an IED to the absolute low point, a date between Marsden's reporter and his pretty next-door neighbor, played by Jessica Biel."

Deborah Young of The Hollywood Reporter wrote, "The reporting team at Knight Ridder Newspapers has been called 'the only ones who got it right' about Saddam Hussein's non-existent weapons of mass destruction that sparked the 2003 Iraq war. Based on a true story, Rob Reiner's Shock and Awe gives much-deserved credit to their far-sighted (if generally unheeded) news coverage, but the message tends to melt into a paint-by-numbers screenplay that pushes too many genre buttons to be thoroughly exciting."

References

External links 
 
 
 

2017 films
2017 drama films
American films based on actual events
American drama films
Biographical films about journalists
Castle Rock Entertainment films
Drama films based on actual events
Films directed by Rob Reiner
Films scored by Jeff Beal
Films shot in Louisiana
Films shot in Washington, D.C.
Iraq War films
Vertical Entertainment films
2010s English-language films
2010s American films